Ian Cairns (born 5 February 1963) is a Scottish actor. He trained at the Royal Scottish Academy of Music and Drama. TV credits include Bob Servant Independent (with Brian Cox), Hughie Green-Most Sincerely (with Trevor Eve), Jekyll (with James Nesbitt), Taggart , Vera and Law and Order: UK. Other credits include Julius Caesar, The Red Balloon and Diary of a Somebody.

References

External links
 Ian Cairns' website
 

1963 births
20th-century Scottish male actors
21st-century Scottish male actors
Alumni of the Royal Conservatoire of Scotland
Living people
Male actors from Dundee
Scottish male film actors
Scottish male television actors